Ratna Pathak Shah (born 18 March 1957) is an Indian actress and director known for her work in Hindi theatre, television, and films. Her extensive work in theatre includes a series of plays in both English and Hindi. She rose to prominence when she appeared in the hit TV serial Idhar Udhar in the 1980s.

She garnered widespread recognition and acclaim with her portrayal of Maya Sarabhai, a snobbish socialite in the cult sitcom Sarabhai vs Sarabhai (2004–2006). Her other prominent roles include the coming-of-age romantic comedy Jaane Tu... Ya Jaane Na (2008), the action comedy Golmaal 3 (2010), the family comedy-drama Kapoor & Sons (2016), and the black-comedy Lipstick Under My Burkha (2017), all of which earned her nominations for the Filmfare Award for Best Supporting Actress. She also received critical acclaim for her performances in the romantic comedies Ek Main Aur Ekk Tu (2012) and Khoobsurat (2014). Her performance in Amazon Prime Video's anthology film Unpaused (2020) earned her a nomination for the Filmfare OTT Award for Best Actress.

Daughter of actress Dina Pathak, she married actor Naseeruddin Shah in 1982, with whom she has two sons. Her sister is actress Supriya Pathak, who is married to actor Pankaj Kapur.

Early life 
Ratna Pathak Shah is a Gujarati Hindu. She was born on 18 March 1957 in Mumbai, India to Baldev Pathak and actress Dina Pathak. She is the sister of actress Supriya Pathak.

Pathak is an alumna of the J. B. Vachha High School, Dadar, Mumbai and the 1981 batch of the National School of Drama, Delhi.

Career 
As well as appearing in many successful films, including Mirch Masala, Ratna Pathak appeared as the wife in The Perfect Murder.

She also acted in the cult sitcom Sarabhai vs Sarabhai where she played Maya Sarabhai, a high society socialite, for which she received the ITA Award for Best Actress – Comedy in 2005.

In July 2008 she appeared in the coming-of-age romantic comedy Jaane Tu Ya Jaane Na as the mother of the protagonist. Naseeruddin Shah played her husband, as a deceased character who talks to her from a portrait. She has also acted in several Russian plays, as well as co-founding and being an active member of "Motley Theatre Group". She appeared in the action comedy Golmaal 3 opposite Mithun Chakraborty. She was a part of the Padma Shri and Padma Bhushan Selection Committee for 2012 Awards. Ratna Pathak Shah, who has appeared in many successful Hindi films, will come first time in a Gujarati movie “Kutch Express Gujarati Movie”.

Personal life 

Ratna Pathak married Naseeruddin Shah in 1982. They have two sons Imaad Shah and Vivaan Shah. Naseeruddin Shah has a daughter, Heeba Shah, from his first marriage.

Filmography

Hindi

English

Gujarati

Television

Awards

References

External links 

 
 

1957 births
Indian film actresses
Indian television actresses
Living people
Actresses in Hindi cinema
Actresses from Mumbai
Indian stage actresses
National School of Drama alumni
20th-century Indian actresses
21st-century Indian actresses
Actresses in Hindi television
Gujarati people
Film directors from Mumbai